Ecclestone is a surname. Notable people with the surname include:
A. W. Ecclestone (1901-1984), British architect
Arthur Ecclestone (1906-1990), English footballer
Bernie Ecclestone (born 1930), British businessman
George Walter Ecclestone (1865-1940), Canadian politician
Giles Ecclestone (born 1968), English cricketer
Petra Ecclestone (born 1988), British model and fashion designer
Simon Ecclestone (born 1971), English cricketer
Slavica Ecclestone (born 1958), model and ex-wife of Bernie
Sophie Ecclestone (born 1999), English cricketer
Tamara Ecclestone (born 1984), English model and TV personality, daughter of Bernie
Tim Ecclestone (born 1947), Canadian ice hockey player
William Ecclestone (died 1623), Shakespearian actor
William Ecclestone (footballer) (1873-1937), English footballer

See also
Eckstein
Eccleston (disambiguation)